The Sun Ra Arkestra is an American jazz group formed in the mid-1950s and led by keyboardist/composer Sun Ra until his death in 1993. The group is considered a pioneer of afrofuturism. As of 2022, the Arkestra is led by saxophonist Marshall Allen, an Arkestra member since 1958, who is supported by more than a dozen other musicians.

History 
The band is headquartered in a rowhouse in Philadelphia's Germantown neighborhood. Saxophonist and current leader Marshall Allen has lived and worked in the house since 1968.

In 1976, Vincent Chancey, an American jazz hornist joined the group.

In 1993, Allen became the leader of Arkestra after Sun Ra died.

In 1999, the Arkestra released the studio album, A Song for the Sun.

In 2009, Philadelphia's Institute of Contemporary Art hosted an exhibition of the group's history and artistry.

In 2012 Tara Middleton, a violinist and vocalist joined the group.

In 2017, the Arkestra opened for Solange on her tour supporting her 2016 album, A Seat at the Table.

In 2019, the Arkestra had a major performance at the Hollywood Theater in Portland, Oregon.

In October 2020, the Sun Ra Arkestra released Swirling, the first album the band released in 20 years. The band recorded the album at Philadelphia's Rittenhouse Soundworks and was released on Strut Records. The album features the first-ever recording of Sun Ra's song "Darkness."

Music style and influences 
The Arkestra draws from a range of musical genres: swing, rock 'n' roll, Chicago blues, improvisation and electronic.

When the Arkestra performs, the band members wear flashy capes and sequined headdresses.

Discography 
Studio Albums
 A Song of the Sun (1999)
 Swirling (2020)
 Living Sky (2022)
See also Sun Ra discography

References

External links
 The Sun Ra Arkestra, official site, under the direction of Marshall Allen
 Sun Ra Arkestra concert at Acht Brücken Festival,  in Cologne, Germany on 2022-06-07 [1:40:57]

Afrofuturism
African-American musical groups
Musical groups from Philadelphia
Germantown, Philadelphia